Insjön is a locality situated in Leksand Municipality, Dalarna County, Sweden with 2,149 inhabitants in 2010. In 1899 Åhléns started out as the mail order business Åhlén & Holm. 19 years later, in 1918, the mail order firm Clas Ohlson was founded in Insjön. The sawmill Bergkvist sågen was also founded here.

References

Populated places in Dalarna County
Populated places in Leksand Municipality